Friedrich Wilhelm Quintscher (3 October 1883 – 8 May 1945), better known under his self-assumed name Rah Omir Quintscher, was a notable German member of the Neopagan religion of Adonism, as well as being a noted occultist and ceremonial magician. In 1922 he founded a group known as the Orden Mentalistischer Bauherren (Order of the Mental Architects), which he closed down in 1928, leading its members to join another occult group, the Fraternitas Saturni. He went on join the Adonistic Society of Franz Sättler, but fell out with him, possibly over a woman, Sättler's lover and secretary, Justine Schnattinger. Leaving the Adonistic Society, Quintscher went on to further propagate Adonism through his own esoteric group, the Atescha-Taganosyn.

References
Footnotes

Bibliography

1893 births
1945 deaths
Esotericism
German magicians
German modern pagans
German occultists
Place of birth missing